Microcolona dorochares is a moth in the family Elachistidae. It is found on Samoa.

References

Moths described in 1927
Microcolona
Moths of Oceania